Helianthella castanea is a rare plant endemic to California, and is found only in the San Francisco Bay Area, mostly in the hills east of the bay, including in Mount Diablo State Park, Wildcat Canyon Regional Park, Briones Regional Park, Las Trampas Regional Wilderness, and surrounding areas. Its common names include Mount Diablo helianthella, Mount Diablo sunflower, and Diablo rockrose.

Helianthella castanea is a herbaceous plant up to 45 cm (18 inches) tall. Leaves are up to 15 cm (6 inches) long. The plant usually produces one yellow flower head per stem. Each head contains both ray flowers and disc flowers.

References

External links
Calflora Database: Helianthella castanea (Mt. Diablo helianthella)
Jepson Flora Project Helianthella castanea

castanea
Endemic flora of California
Natural history of the California chaparral and woodlands
Natural history of the California Coast Ranges
Natural history of Contra Costa County, California
Berkeley Hills
Mount Diablo
Plants described in 1893
Taxa named by Edward Lee Greene
Endemic flora of the San Francisco Bay Area